Gung Ye ( – 24 July 918, r. July 901 – 24 July 918) was the king of the short-lived state of Taebong (901–918), one of the Later Three Kingdoms of Korea. Although he was a member of the Silla royal family, he became a victim of the power struggle among the royal family members during the late 9th century. He became a rebel leader against the unpopular Silla government, which almost abandoned the affairs of their subjects for the struggle for power among royal family members.

Birth 
The exact date of Gung Ye's birth is unknown, but records assume that he was a son of King Gyeongmun; his mother is said to be a beloved lady of the court.

According to legend, Gung Ye was born on the traditional holiday of Dano. The royal seer prophesied that a baby born on Dano would bring disaster to the nation, and the court officials and royal family members urged to the king to get rid of the infant. So the king ordered his servants to kill him. However, when the troops rushed to the residence of Gung Ye's mother, she threw her baby from the second floor, with her maid hiding in nearby bushes to catch the baby. Although her plot tricked the soldiers, the maid had accidentally poked the left eye of the baby, causing Gung Ye to lose one eye. She hid Gung Ye and raised him secretly; when she died, Gung Ye became a Buddhist monk at Sedalsa (세달사), a Buddhist temple.

Revolt 
At the time, the monarch of Silla was Queen Jinseong (Gung Ye's half sister), who was the third female head of state in Korean history (the other three being: Queen Seondeok of Silla, Jindeok of Silla, and later President Park Geun-hye). Queen Jinseong was a powerless ruler and the government was largely corrupted by interventions of royal family members and rampant bribery among members of the royal court. The corrupt government continuously exploited the peasants and farmers, and after a year of famine, massively raised taxes in 889 which led to many revolts and rebellions. Local aristocrats, called hojok (hangul:호족, hanja:豪族) emerged as de facto rulers of many provinces, with the attention of government concentrated on suppression of rebellion and their own power struggles. Among the rebel leaders and local aristocrats, Gi Hwon and Yang Gil gained the most power.

Gung Ye first joined the troops of Gi Hwon in 891 but left shortly after as Gi Hwon did not fully trust him. Gung Ye joined Yang Gil's rebellion force in 892, and became leading general of the rebel forces by defeating the local Silla army and other rebel groups. Most local aristocrats of Myeongju and Paeseo, including Wang Gun, submitted to his force, making him even more powerful than his master Yang Gil. Silla, after nearly a millennium as a centralized kingdom was quickly declining, and Gung Ye instigated his own rebellion in present-day Kaesŏng in 898. After turning against his master, Yang Gil, he eventually defeated and subjugated him and other local lords in central Korea to proclaim himself king of Hugoguryeo in 901 as the claimant successor state to the renowned former hegemon of Northeast Asia, the Empire of Goguryeo. With his rival Gyeon Hwon's Hubaekje taking control of the peninsula's southwest as the claimant successor state to the maritime empire of Baekje, he opened up the Later Three Kingdoms period of Korean History, a reference to the so-called Three Kingdoms period of Korea, several centuries earlier.

Downfall 
Gung Ye changed the country's name to Majin in 904, and moved the capital to Cheorwon in the following year. Since Cheorwon was a fortress located in a mountainous area, he moved people from the populous city of Cheongju and expanded his rule into the Chungcheong region, taking control of almost two-thirds of the land once controlled by Silla. In the same year Gung Ye took over Pyeongyang and called for total destruction of the state of Silla.

Searching for a better way to unite his citizens, he wanted a more potent unifying theology. Therefore, around 905, he turned to religion. He decided what was needed to unite people under his power was religious faith, and using his previous occupation as a Buddhist monk, he referred to himself as Maitreya Buddha, who came to the world to guide and save the suffering people from all hardship. He changed the name of his kingdom to Taebong in 911. 

In his later days, it is recorded that Gung Ye started to have paranoia. He accused many arbitrarily of treason and sentenced anyone who opposed him to death, including Kang, one of his wives, and his two sons. As a result, in 918 four of his own top generals – Hong Yu (hangul:홍유, hanja:洪儒), Bae Hyeongyeong (hangul:배현경, hanja:裵玄慶), Sin Sung-gyeom and Bok Jigyeom (hangul:복지겸, hanja:卜智謙) – overthrew Taebong and enthroned Wang Geon, one of Gung Ye's followers and the previous chief minister, of his nation, as king. Gung Ye is said to have escaped the palace, but was killed shortly thereafter either by a soldier or by peasants who mistook him for a thief.

Soon thereafter, the Goryeo dynasty was proclaimed, and Wang Geon went on to defeat the rivaling Silla and Hubaekje to reunite the three kingdoms in 936.

Alternative theory of origin 
Some historians present a theory that states that Gung Ye was, in fact, a direct descendant of Go Anseung, who had been the ruler of Goguryeo-Guk, which had been a failed Goguryeo revival state. Records of Silla reported that Go Anseung was given the surname of the Silla Royal Family, "Kim." Therefore, Gung Ye's commonly known origin as a prince of Silla was right in a way, but Gung Ye being a son of a king of Silla may have not been true.

Harem
Wife: Queen Kang (강비, died 915)
Son: Kim Cheong-gwang (김청광, died 915)
Son: Kim Sin-gwang (김신광, died 915)
Son: Kim Sun-baek (김순백)

Legacy 
Even though Gung Ye was not able to keep his rule and achieve the reunification of the Korean peninsula under his rule, many scholars today are attempting to review the true character of Gung Ye. Historical records regarding Gung Ye are negative, since many historians during the Goryeo Dynasty tried to justify the coup by Wang Geon that dethroned Gung Ye, in order to give legitimacy to the dynasty. However, even after the founding of Goryeo, many people rejected the rule of Wang Geon and rebelled against the newly formed dynasty; some even voluntarily defected to Gyeon Hwon's Hubaekje. It can be assumed that many people, even after the coup that crowned Wang Geon, favored the rule of Gung Ye and that he was not a total despot as described in history. Some scholars explain Gung Ye's self-proclamation as Buddha as an attempt to strengthen his power, since he, as a royal family member of Silla, had no influence over powerful local landlords and merchants, so he tried to use the power of religion in order to keep his rule, which did not prove to be effective.

Popular culture 
 Portrayed by Kim Yeong-cheol and Maeng Se-chang in the 2000-2002 KBS1 TV series Taejo Wang Geon.

References 

 The Academy of Korean Studies, Korea through the Ages Vol. 1, The Editor Publishing Co., Seoul, 2005. 

860s births
918 deaths
Year of birth uncertain
10th-century rulers in Asia
Silla Buddhist monks
Korean rulers
Korean Buddhist monarchs
People related with Late Three Kingdoms
Korean politicians with disabilities